Thierry De Groote (born 9 May 1975 in Deinze, Belgium) is a professional road bicycle racer.

He started his professional career in 2001 at the Belgium team Palmans-Colstrop.

De Groote lives in Nazareth, Belgium.

Palmarès

1993
1st, Eindklassement Ster van Zuid-Limburg, Juniores
2nd, Trofee van Vlaanderen Reningelst, Juniores
1996
3rd, 2e etappe Ronde van Limburg, Herderen-Riemst
2000
2nd, Hasselt - Spa - Hasselt
1st, Zesbergen prijs Harelbeke
2nd, 6e etappe tour de liège.
2nd, Eindklassement Pour de kliège
2002
2nd Hel van het Mergelland
2nd, Mere
2nd, Zwevegem
2003
2nd, 1e etappe Tour de la region De Wallonne
2nd, Vichte
2007
1st, 1e etappe Triptyque Ardennais, Sprimont

Teams
2001-2003 = Palmans-Colstrop
2005 = landbouwkrediet-colnago
2006 = Jartazi
2007 = yawadoo - Colba - ABM

References

1975 births
Living people
People from Deinze
Belgian male cyclists
Cyclists from East Flanders